Valéry Mayet (2 January 1839, in Lyon – 1909) was a French entomologist. He was professor of zoology in Montpellier at the French National School of Agriculture (École nationale d'agriculture).

Publications
 Sur l'oeuf du Phylloxera, 1881 (On the eggs of phylloxera).
 Résultats des traitements effectués en Suisse en vue de la destruction du Phylloxera, 1881 (Results on treatments used in Switzerland for destruction of phylloxera).
 Voyage dans le sud de la Tunisie. 1886 (Travel into southern Tunisia).
 Les Insectes de la vigne. Montpellier: Camille Coulet, 1890.
 The phylloxera of the vine, by Valéry Mayet; translated for the Board of Viticultural Commissioners, 1894.
 La Cochenille des vignes du Chili. 1895 (The cochineal of Chilean vineyards).
 Essai de géographie zoologique de l'Hérault. 1898 (Zoological geography of Herault).
 Catalogue raisonné des reptiles et batraciens de la Tunisie. 1903 (Catalogue raisonné of reptiles and amphibians of Tunisia.

References 

French entomologists
1839 births
1909 deaths
Scientists from Lyon
Academic staff of the University of Montpellier